Nadodrze is a housing estate in Wrocław, Poland, separated in 1991 from a larger district, Olin, which now lies to the east of it. It also borders Kleczkow to the north and the Old Town to the west. Nadodrze, known as Oder Suburb (German: Oder Vorstadt), was incorporated into the city in 1808, after the demolition of the city fortifications.

The neighborhood was a historically poor and dangerous area, but since 2005 it was redeveloped, and became known for its arts scene. It is sometimes compared to Berlin's Kreuzberg or Rome's Trastevere.

Location 

Within the boundaries of Nadodrze, there is Kępa Mieszczańska island, and important objects of urban infrastructure: Wrocław Nadodrze train station, streetcar depot no. 2 at Słowiańska Street, and Wrocław Combined Heat and Power Plant. The seat of the Nadodrze Housing Estate Council is located at 43 Rydygiera St. In 2017, about 25 thousand people lived within the boundaries of Nadodrze. The district is one of the most densely populated areas in Wroclaw.

History and development 

Nadodrze is known both for its historical kamienicas and for its industrial development. Soon after World War II and the transfer of the city to Poland, the demographic composition of the population changed. Richer residents began to settle elsewhere, leading to a gradual decline, an increase in poverty and crime, and infrastructural decay.

The revitalization of Nadodrze began only in 2005, and soon the neighborhood became the "symbol of Wrocław's revitalization". Dozens of historic houses, two main squares, schools, parks, and public spaces were renovated. Revitalization was also accompanied by the mass privatization of private apartments. Some researchers saw in the revitalization process a threat of gentrification. The city's program was criticized because it concentrated on cosmetic changes rather than attempts to improve the quality of life of the neighborhood's residents.

The Łokietka 5 – Infopunkt Nadodrze is a center for supporting activities for the development of Nadodrze. It deals with cultural initiatives, coordinates inhabitants and local authorities, and brings together various communities functioning in Nadodrze.

One of the new tourist attractions of Nadodrze is colorful courtyards at 14–16 Roosvelta Street. The work (niemural), which is a combination of ceramics, painting, and sculpture, is a joint effort of local residents in cooperation with Wroclaw artists and students of the Academy of Fine Arts. It is 250 meters long and covers an area of 1200 square meters. The neighborhood is also famous for its numerous cafes, stores, and art galleries.

In 2014, Nadodrze's Kurkowa Street was used for filming of the Steven Spielberg film Bridge of Spies, a Cold War-era spy thriller. Working alongside the Wrocław Film Commission, the film's producers set the street up to resemble Berlin in the 1950s and 1960s.

Gallery

Famous people

 Anna German, Polish singer

See also
Gentrification

References

External links

 The alternative Poland on show in Wrocław, The Guardian
 

 
Hipster neighborhoods